Nikolay Ivanovich Krivtsov (3 September 1945, in Oryol Oblast - 25 November 2011) was a Russian apiologist, Doctor of Agricultural Sciences, Professor, Academician of the Russian Academy of Agricultural Sciences (2007).
Since 1988, Director of the Russian Research Institute of Apiculture.

He graduated with honors from the Oryol State University in 1970, and defended his Candidat thesis in 1975. In 1992, he defended his doctoral thesis about selection of bees of the Central Russian breed.

He was a member of the Russian Apitherapy Coordinating Council.
He was a member of the editorial board of the Russian journal "Pchelovodstvo".
He was also a Member of the Petrovskaya Academy of Sciences and Arts.

Honored Scientist of the Russian Federation (2011).
Laureate of the State Prize of the Russian Federation in the field of science and technology for the year 2000, and became a laureate of the Government of the Russian Federation in the field of education in 2004.

References

External links
 Biographical Encyclopedia of the Russian Academy of Agriculture Sciences (in Russian)

1945 births
2011 deaths
Russian beekeepers
Academicians of the Russian Academy of Agriculture Sciences
State Prize of the Russian Federation laureates